Coalseam Cliffs are rock cliffs forming the north-western part of Mount Faraway in the Theron Mountains. They were first mapped in 1956–57 by the Commonwealth Trans-Antarctic Expedition (CTAE), and so named because a coal seam was found when members of the CTAE made an aircraft landing there in 1957.

Important Bird Area
Coalseam Cliffs is part of the 665 ha Coalseam Cliffs and Mount Faraway Important Bird Area (IBA), designated as such by BirdLife International because it supports a colony of about 10,000 breeding pairs of Antarctic petrels. The birds nest in a scree-filled hollow between two 60 m high dolerite cliffs, a location also known as Stewart Buttress. Other birds recorded as breeding in the vicinity include snow petrels and south polar skuas.

References

External links
 

Important Bird Areas of Antarctica
Seabird colonies
Cliffs of Coats Land